The New Zealand men's national softball team (nicknamed the Black Sox/Black Socks) is the national softball team for New Zealand. They have won the ISF Men's World Championship seven times, becoming World Champions in 1976 (1st = with US and Canada), 1984, 1996, 2000, 2004, 2013 and 2017. They also won the inaugural Commonwealth Championships (a round robin tournament between New Zealand, Australia, Samoa, South Africa and Botswana) in 2006. The "Black Sox" name is one of many national team nicknames related to the All Blacks as well as to famous "Sox" baseball teams. The female team is known as the White Sox

On 16 July 2017, New Zealand (Black Sox) defeated Australia (Aussie Steelers), six runs to four in the final of the 2017 ISF Men's World Championship held in Canada.

Results and fixtures
The following is a list of match results in the last 12 months, as well as any future matches that have been scheduled.

2022

Players

Current squad
The following players were called up for the 2022 Men's Softball World Championship in New Zealand.

Competitive Record

Men's Softball World Cup

Honours
Men's Softball World Cup
Champions (7): 1976, 1984, 1996, 2000, 2004, 2013, 2017
Runners-up (4): 1988, 1992, 2009, 2015
Third place (2): 1966, 1972

References

External links
 Softball New Zealand

Men's national softball teams
Soft
Softball in New Zealand
Men's sport in New Zealand